Cosmopterix vexillaris is a moth in the  family Cosmopterigidae. It is found in India.

References

Natural History Museum Lepidoptera generic names catalog

vexillaris